Kay Poe (born 15 May 1982) is an American taekwondo practitioner from Houston, Texas. She is a two time Olympian. She competed at the 2000 Summer Olympics in Sydney. She won a silver medal in flyweight at the 1999 Pan American Games in Winnipeg.

References

External links

1982 births
Living people
People from Houston
American female taekwondo practitioners
Olympic taekwondo practitioners of the United States
Taekwondo practitioners at the 2000 Summer Olympics
Pan American Games medalists in taekwondo
Pan American Games silver medalists for the United States
Taekwondo practitioners at the 1999 Pan American Games
World Taekwondo Championships medalists
Medalists at the 1999 Pan American Games
21st-century American women